Allenton is an unincorporated community in Wilcox County, Alabama, United States.

Geography

Demographics

Allenton

Allenton first appeared on the 1880 U.S. Census as an unincorporated village.  It has not appeared separately on the census since.

Historic Demographics

Allenton Precinct (1870-1950)

The beat (precinct) containing Allenton first appeared on the 1870 U.S. Census as Allenton-9th Beat of Wilcox County. It continued to report as the 9th precinct until 1950. In 1960, the precincts were merged and/or reorganized into census divisions (as part of a general reorganization of counties) and it was consolidated into the census division of Pine Apple.

References

Notes

References

Unincorporated communities in Alabama
Unincorporated communities in Wilcox County, Alabama